Konstantin Kravchuk and Denys Molchanov were the defending champions, but Molchanov chose not to compete Kravchuk played with Teymuraz Gabashvili but lost in the quarterfinals.
Riccardo Ghedin and Claudio Grassi won in the final against Andrey Golubev and Mikhail Kukushkin 3–6, 6–3, [10–8].

Seeds

Draw

Draw

References
 Main Draw

President's Cup (tennis)- Doubles
2013 Doubles